The 1987 Texas A&M Aggies football team represented Texas A&M University in the 1987 NCAA Division I-A football season as a member of the Southwest Conference (SWC). The team was led by head coach Jackie Sherrill, in his sixth year, and played their home games at Kyle Field in College Station, Texas. They finished the season with a record of ten wins and two losses (10–2, 6–1 SWC), as Southwest Conference champions and with a victory over Notre Dame in the Cotton Bowl Classic.

Schedule

Roster
QB Bucky Richardson, Fr.

Game summaries

Arkansas

Team players drafted into the NFL

Reference:

References

Texas AandM
Texas A&M Aggies football seasons
Southwest Conference football champion seasons
Cotton Bowl Classic champion seasons
Texas A&M Aggies football